Viktor Grigoryevich Tishchenko (born February 22, 1949) is a Russian professional football coach and a former player. Currently, he is a director of sports with FC Lokomotiv Moscow.

External links
 Career summary at KLISF

1949 births
Living people
Soviet footballers
Russian football managers
FC Lada-Tolyatti managers
FC Chernomorets Novorossiysk managers
Russian Premier League managers
Russian expatriate sportspeople in Kazakhstan
Expatriate footballers in Kazakhstan
Association football midfielders